Caroline Trompeter (born 14 July 1994) is a German slalom canoeist who has competed at the international level since 2010.

She won a gold medal in the inaugural Extreme K1 event at the 2017 ICF Canoe Slalom World Championships in Pau and a bronze medal in the same event in 2019 in Prague.

She won the overall World Cup title in Extreme slalom in 2021.

World Cup individual podiums

1 World Championship counting for World Cup points

References

External links

German female canoeists
Living people
1994 births
Medalists at the ICF Canoe Slalom World Championships